Atalaya capensis (also called Cape wing-nut) is a species of plant in the family Sapindaceae. It is endemic to the Cape Provinces of South Africa.

References

capensis
Flora of the Cape Provinces
Conservation dependent plants
Taxonomy articles created by Polbot